Albert Ralph Campbell (April 8, 1875 – December 4, 1925) was an American Private serving in the United States Marine Corps during the Boxer Rebellion who received the Medal of Honor for bravery.

Biography
Campbell was born April 8, 1875, in Williamsport, Pennsylvania, and after entering the Marine Corps he was sent as a private to China to fight in the Boxer Rebellion.

He died December 4, 1925, and is buried in Forest Lawn Memorial Park Glendale, California.

Medal of Honor citation
Rank and organization: Private, U.S. Marine Corps. Born: 8 April 1875, Williamsport, Pa. Accredited to: Pennsylvania. G.O. No.: 55, 19 July 1901.

Citation:

In action at Tientsin, China, 21 June 1900. During the advance on Tientsin, Campbell distinguished himself by his conduct.

See also

List of Medal of Honor recipients
List of Medal of Honor recipients for the Boxer Rebellion

References

External links

1875 births
1925 deaths
United States Marine Corps Medal of Honor recipients
United States Marine Corps non-commissioned officers
American military personnel of the Boxer Rebellion
People from Williamsport, Pennsylvania
Boxer Rebellion recipients of the Medal of Honor